The El Cajon Police Department (ECPD) is the municipal police agency responsible for enforcing laws, maintaining social order, and ensuring public safety within the city of El Cajon, California.

The current police chief is Mike Moulton who took over for the retiring Chief Jeff Davis on Sept. 13, 2019 who took over for the retiring Chief Jim Redman, on December 5, 2015.

The El Cajon Police Department is a member of the San Diego County-Imperial County Regional Communications System.

The El Cajon Police Department Forensic Science Laboratory is accredited by the American Society of Crime Laboratory Directors/Laboratory Accreditation Board (ASCLD/LAB).

Divisions    
 Animal Control
 Crisis Negotiation Team
 Communications
 Investigations
 Mounted Patrol
 Patrol
 Records
 Reserves & Cadets -- for ages 16 to 21 who are interested in pursuing a career in law enforcement // unpaid sworn in reserve officers 
 RSVP & Volunteers
 Special Enforcement
 SWAT
 Traffic

Notable cases 

 Granite Hills High School shooting
 Operation Shadowbox

Notable members 

 William John Cox (Billy Jack Cox), public interest attorney, author and political activist served as a police officer and detective between 1962 and 1968.

External links 
 El Cajon Police Department
 El Cajon Police Department Neighborhood Headquarters

Municipal police departments of California
El Cajon, California
Organizations based in San Diego County, California